Saccharata is a genus of fungi in the family Botryosphaeriaceae. There are 4 species.

Species
Saccharata capensis
Saccharata intermedia
Saccharata kirstenboschensis
Saccharata proteae

References

External links
 Index Fungorum

Botryosphaeriales